Green Gate may refer to the following tourist attractions:

Green Gate in Poland
Green Gate, Potsdam, the main entrance to Sanssouci Park in Potsdam, Germany
Green Gate, Devon, in Devon, England

See also 
Greengates